Hartsell is a surname. Notable people with the surname include:

Danielle Hartsell (born 1980), American pair skater
Fletcher L. Hartsell Jr. (born 1947), American politician
Harry Hartsell (1890–1955), American football, basketball and baseball player, coach and athletics administrator
Mark Hartsell (born 1973), American football player
Steve Hartsell (born 1978), American pair skater